KLYR may refer to:

 KLYR (AM), a radio station (1360 AM) licensed to serve Clarksville, Arkansas, United States
 KDYN-FM, a radio station (92.7 FM) licensed to serve Clarksville, Arkansas, which held the call sign KLYR-FM until 2013